Márcio Miranda Freitas Rocha da Silva (born 20 March 1981), commonly known as Marcinho, is a Brazilian retired footballer who played as either an attacking midfielder or a forward, and is the assistant manager of Red Bull Bragantino.

Club career
Born in Campinas, Marcinho played for Corinthians, Palmeiras, Paulista and São Caetano. He was loaned to Kashima Antlers on 24 June 2008, and played for the Japanese squad until the end of the season.

Marcinho signed for Atlético Paranaense on 12 January 2009. In January 2010 he joined Al-Ahli on loan.

International career
Marcinho made one and only appearance for Brazil in 3-0 win in a friendly game against Guatemala in São Paulo on 27 April 2005.

Career statistics

International

Honours

Club
Etti Jundiaí
Campeonato Brasileiro Série C: 2001

Corinthians
Copa do Brasil: 2002
Torneio Rio-São Paulo: 2002

São Caetano
Campeonato Paulista: 2004

Ituano
Campeonato Paulista: 2014

Cruzeiro
Campeonato Mineiro: 2008

Kashima Antlers
J1 League: 2008

Atlético Paranaense
Campeonato Paranaense: 2009

Al-Ahli
Saudi Champions Cup : 2011

International
Brazil U20
South American Youth Championship: 2001

References

External links

 CBF
 placar
 Guardian Stats Centre

1981 births
Living people
Sportspeople from Campinas
Brazilian footballers
Association football midfielders
Association football forwards
Campeonato Brasileiro Série A players
Paulista Futebol Clube players
Sport Club Corinthians Paulista players
Associação Desportiva São Caetano players
Sociedade Esportiva Palmeiras players
Cruzeiro Esporte Clube players
Club Athletico Paranaense players
Associação Atlética Ponte Preta players
Red Bull Brasil players
Ituano FC players
Associação Desportiva Cabofriense players
J1 League players
Kashima Antlers players
Saudi Professional League players
Al-Ahli Saudi FC players
Brazilian expatriate footballers
Brazilian expatriate sportspeople in Japan
Brazilian expatriate sportspeople in Saudi Arabia
Expatriate footballers in Japan
Expatriate footballers in Saudi Arabia
Brazilian football managers
Campeonato Brasileiro Série A managers
Red Bull Bragantino managers
Brazil international footballers